The Battles of the Isonzo (known as the Isonzo Front by historians) were a series of 12 battles between the Austro-Hungarian and Italian armies in World War I mostly on the territory of present-day Slovenia, and the remainder in Italy along the Isonzo River on the eastern sector of the Italian Front between June 1915 and November 1917.

Italian military plans
In April 1915, in the secret Treaty of London, Italy was promised by the Allies some of the territories of Austro-Hungarian Empire which were mainly inhabited by ethnic Slovenes and Austrian Germans.

Italian commander Luigi Cadorna, a staunch proponent of the frontal assault who claimed the Western Front proved the ineffectiveness of machine guns, initially planned breaking onto the Slovenian plateau, taking Ljubljana and threatening Vienna. The area between the northernmost part of the Adriatic Sea and the sources of the Isonzo River thus became the scene of twelve successive battles.

As a result, the Austro-Hungarians were forced to move some of their forces from the Eastern Front and a war in the mountains around the Isonzo River began.

Geography

The sixty-mile long Soča River at the time ran entirely inside Austria-Hungary in parallel to the border with Italy, from the Vršič and Predil passes in the Julian Alps to the Adriatic Sea, widening dramatically a few kilometers north of Gorizia, thus opening a narrow corridor between Northern Italy and Central Europe, which goes through the Vipava Valley and the relatively low north-eastern edge of the Karst Plateau to Inner Carniola and Ljubljana. The corridor is also known as the "Ljubljana Gate".

By the autumn of 1915 one mile had been won by Italian troops, and by October 1917 a few Austro-Hungarian mountains and some square miles of land had changed hands several times. Italian troops did not reach the port of Trieste, the Italian General Luigi Cadorna's initial target, until after the Armistice.

Primary sector for Italian operations

With the rest of the mountainous  length of the Front being almost everywhere dominated by Austro-Hungarian forces, the Soča (Isonzo) was the only practical area for Italian military operations during the war. The Austro-Hungarians had fortified the mountains ahead of the Italians' entry into the war on 23 May 1915.

Italian Chief of Staff Luigi Cadorna judged that Italian gains (from Gorizia to Trieste) were most feasible at the coastal plain east of the lower end of the Soča (Isonzo). However he also believed that the Italian army could strike further north and bypass the mountains on either side of the river so as to come at the Austro-Hungarian forces from the rear.

Cadorna had not expected operations in the Isonzo sector to be easy. He was well aware that the river was prone to flooding—and indeed there were record rainfalls during 1914–1918.

Further, when attacking further north the Italian army was faced with something of a dilemma: in order to cross the Isonzo safely it needed to neutralise the Austro-Hungarian defenders on the mountains above, yet to neutralise these forces the Italian forces needed first to cross the river—an obstacle that the Italians never succeeded in overcoming.

In the south (along the coastal zone) geographic peculiarities, including an array of ridges and valleys, also gave an advantage to the Austro-Hungarian defenders.

Casualties

Despite the huge effort and resources poured into the continuing Isonzo struggle, the results were invariably disappointing and without real tactical merit, particularly given the geographical difficulties that were inherent in the campaign.

Cumulative casualties of the numerous battles of the Isonzo were enormous. Half of the entire Italian war death total—some 300,000 of 600,000—were suffered along the Soča (Isonzo). Austro-Hungarian losses, while by no means as numerous, were nevertheless high at around 200,000 (of an overall total of around 1.2 million casualties).

More than 30,000 casualties were ethnic Slovenes, the majority of them being drafted into the Austro-Hungarian Army, while Slovene civilian inhabitants from the Gorizia and Gradisca region also suffered in many thousands because they were resettled in refugee camps where Slovene refugees were treated as state enemies by Italians, and some thousands died of malnutrition in Italian refugee camps.

Number of battles

With almost continuous combat in the area, the precise number of battles forming the Isonzo campaign is debatable. Some historians have assigned distinct names to a couple of the Isonzo struggles, most notably at Kobarid (Caporetto or Karfreit) in October 1917, which would otherwise form the Twelfth Battle of the Isonzo.

The fact that the battles were always named after the Isonzo River, even in Italy, was considered by some a propaganda success for Austria-Hungary: it highlighted the repeated Italian failure to breach this landmark frontier of the Empire.

The Isonzo campaign comprised the following battles:

First Battle of the Isonzo – 23 June – 7 July 1915
Second Battle of the Isonzo – 18 July – 3 August 1915
Third Battle of the Isonzo – 18 October – 3 November 1915
Fourth Battle of the Isonzo – 10 November – 2 December 1915
Fifth Battle of the Isonzo – 9–17 March 1916
Sixth Battle of the Isonzo – 6–17 August 1916
Seventh Battle of the Isonzo – 14–17 September 1916
Eighth Battle of the Isonzo – 10–12 October 1916
Ninth Battle of the Isonzo – 1–4 November 1916
Tenth Battle of the Isonzo – 12 May – 8 June 1917
Eleventh Battle of the Isonzo – 19 August – 12 September 1917
Twelfth Battle of the Isonzo – 24 October – 7 November 1917, also known as the Battle of Caporetto

In media
 Ernest Hemingway's A Farewell to Arms is partly during the events along this front.
 Italian poet Giuseppe Ungaretti's autobiographical poem, "I Fiumi", was written about the Isonzo whilst he was stationed on the Front.
 Mark Helprin's A Soldier of the Great War refers to parts of the Isonzo campaign.
 The twelfth battle is the subject of the novel Caporetto by the Swedish author F. J. Nordstedt, Stockholm 1972.
 The Twelve Battles are the inspiration for the titular 2022 game.

References

Sources

External links

FirstWorldWar.Com The Battles of the Isonzo, 1915–17
FirstWorldWar.Com Battlefield Maps: Italian Front
11 battles at the Isonzo
The Walks of Peace in the Soča Region Foundation. The Foundation preserves, restores and presents the historical and cultural heritage of the First World War in the area of the Isonzo Front for the study, tourist and educational purposes.
The Kobarid Museum (in English)
Društvo Soška Fronta (in Slovene)
Pro Hereditate – extensive site (in English, Italian, and Slovene)
Interactive map with the extensive documentation with 360° Surround photography virtual tours
 Rapporto Ufficiale. Published 1929–1974. 10 books - free access to the full texts (Italian))

 
Military history of Italy during World War I
Austria-Hungary in World War I
Military history of Slovenia